also simply known as Sonic Chronicles, is a 2008 role-playing video game developed by BioWare and published by Sega for the Nintendo DS. The game was BioWare's first handheld video game project, and is a part of the Sonic the Hedgehog series. Sonic Chronicles initially focuses on the events surrounding the kidnapping of Knuckles and the disappearance of the Chaos Emeralds after the defeat of Doctor Eggman, before moving on to follow the cast of characters across two dimensions as they encounter a new ally, Shade the Echidna, and seek to stop the invasion of their world by Ix, the leader of Shade's tribe, the Nocturnus.

The game was released in Russia, Europe, and North America in September 2008, and then in Japan the following year. It was met with generally mixed reviews from critics, who appreciated both the graphics and environments, as well as Sonic overall transition to the role-playing genre, while the music and story were received with mixed reactions, as were some gameplay elements, such as the combat system. The game also garnered controversy after former comic writer Ken Penders sued Sega and BioWare over it, claiming that the Nocturnus Clan were too similar to his Dark Legion.

Gameplay 

Two main types of gameplay are featured: exploration and combat. In exploration areas, the character is controlled by tapping the stylus where the player wants the character to go, while action buttons are used to traverse certain elements, such as vertical loops. Navigation can also require a certain character to be in the lead for progress to continue, taking advantage of that character's special ability, be it flying, climbing, or jumping large gaps. Puzzle elements also feature allowing the party to break up to complete the task, such as pressing switches in various areas.

Combat gameplay occurs when enemies are walked into, shifting the view to a close-up for turn-based battles to occur. Standard attacks are available, while special attacks, dubbed POW Moves, can be performed by rhythmically tapping the stylus. These will use up POW Points, in a manner similar to Magic Points in other RPGs. Examples of individual special attacks include Sonic's Axe Kick and Whirlwind, while some group-based special attacks require certain characters in the party, such as the Blue Bomber, which requires both Sonic and Tails. After combat is complete, loot is available, ranging from healing items to character equipment - equippable in one of three slots per character - while experience points boosts up to two of four attributes per character: speed, attack, defense, and luck.

Characters can also collect and equip Chao, each with their own ability, to enhance a team member's status. These Chao are collectable and can be stored in the Chao Garden, and using the DS's wireless connectivity, players can swap the Chao they have collected.

The game features areas and music from previous Sonic games, such as Green Hill Zone, Sonic Adventure, Sonic the Hedgehog 3 and Sonic Adventure 2. Most of the music in the game are arrangements of themes from Sonic 3D Blast and Sonic CD.

Plot 
The story of Sonic Chronicles is split into two acts, which are further divided into several chapters. The first takes place in Sonic's world, with the team attempting to unravel the situation they are in, while also stopping the Master Emerald from being taken. The second act sees Sonic and the team traveling to another dimension, called the Twilight Cage, in order to stop a new threat to their own world.

Sonic Chronicles opens by detailing Eggman's defeat, and presumed death, some time ago after the destruction of the Egg Carrier at the hands of Sonic and friends. In the present, Sonic is on vacation when he receives a call from Tails, stating that Knuckles has been kidnapped by a group called the Marauders, and they have stolen the Chaos Emeralds. Travelling with Amy to meet Tails, they are escorted by Rouge the Bat to meet the GUN Commander, who informs them that they have been watching the Marauders for some time, and know where to search. Having no luck, they eventually locate the Marauders' base in the Mystic Ruins and with the help of Big the Cat, they find Knuckles, who is found escaping from some robots; leaving the base, they find Angel Island has gone. Devices found in their initial search help them locate Eggman, who claims to be a reformed character, revealing that he survived the crash of the Egg Carrier by anticipating his own defeat and making a robot that would rescue him. He informs the team that Angel Island is being pulled to Metropolis, the location of the Marauders' main base.

With Metropolis as their next destination, they meet Shadow and he joins up in order to find E-123 Omega, but are attacked by Shade and her Marauders. She reveals herself to be an Echidna of the Nocturnus Tribe, leaving Knuckles, supposedly the last of the Echidnas, shocked. After her defeat, the team head to Angel Island to get the Master Emerald before the Marauders, but are shot down; they confront the Nocturnus leader, the Grand Imperator Ix, who reveals his plot to take over the dimension. Shade is shocked, having believed that Ix merely wanted to bring her clan back to Earth, as they had been sealed in an alternate dimension called the Twilight Cage. Tails and Eggman arrive with a non-lethal weapon, using it to transport several of the Nocturnus back to the Twilight Cage, but Ix escapes and steals the Master Emerald. This causes Angel Island to fall from the sky, and Knuckles saves Shade as the island crashes into Metropolis.

Tails and Eggman build a vehicle, dubbed the Cyclone, that will transport them to the other dimension, but Eggman claims he must remain to ensure their safe return; as they leave, he reveals that he has a more sinister plan in mind for them. Once in the Twilight Cage, the team encounter the rock-like Kron Colony, who assist them on their journey by providing them with a Chaos Emerald. Next, they meet the N'rrgal Colony, who will give the team their Chaos Emerald if they take a weapon from their enemies, the Zoah. Having gained the Zoah's weapon by defeating their leader in combat, the team discover it is another Chaos Emerald — the two races realise they have been duped by Ix, who gave them the Emeralds to keep each other in check. Two further Emeralds are found in the Voxai Colonies, inhabited by a telepathic race who have been controlled by a group of three Voxai known as the Overmind, whose dominating telepathic power stemmed from the use of Chaos Emeralds. The team defeat them, and the new leader gives them the two Emeralds that had been given to them by Ix.

With the remaining two Emeralds on Nocturne, the team gathers the leaders of all encountered colonies and carry out a plan to invade the Nocturnus home world. The Voxai find weaknesses in the force field around the planet, the Zoah fly a spaceship created by the Kron towards it and launch a missile which deploys a small group of N'rrgal to eat a hole in the force field. Splitting into two teams, they defeat two Gizoids (Scylla and Charyb) who each use a Chaos Emerald to wield the elements of fire and water, and also lower the force field surrounding Nocturne in order to allow the invading forces from the other Twilight Cage races to attack. Both Knuckles and Sonic's team then fights Ix, and are victorious; Ix then uses the Master Emerald to achieve a very powerful Transformation, but Sonic uses the Chaos Emeralds to become Super Sonic, and finally defeats him. As Nocturne begins to fall, and is nearly destroyed, the team escapes to the Cyclone and heads back to Earth. However, once they've arrived back in Metropolis, they find Eggman waiting for them with a fully rebuilt Metropolis, and the team take the Cyclone to confront the new Eggman Empire. The game ends at this cliffhanger moment as Eggman fires lasers at the Cyclone, shooting it down from the sky. Sonic, Tails, and Omega then break the fourth wall by citing the credits themselves.

Development and release 

Development began in 2006 when BioWare began to look into developing a handheld video game project. Some time thereafter, the development of a Sonic handheld game began, and eventually the project had over 30 people involved. As BioWare's first handheld project, the BioWare development team, used to the long development cycles of video games, had to adjust to the change of pace that handheld development brought. BioWare's employees were fans of the Sonic series as a whole, and felt they could bring their reputation for strong story-driven games to expand the Sonic series. While wanting to stay true to the Sonic franchise as a whole, they also wanted to add their own touches, such as introducing original, darker elements to the storyline; the second dimension, including its new characters and locations, was one such element.

The design process for gameplay was built on the idea of satisfying four "activity pillars": story and character, encompassing characters that the player would want to get to know and spend time with; combat, encompassing conflict as the game progresses; progression customization, so that players are able to upgrade their characters as they see fit with such elements as new abilities and attributes; and exploration, in which the player can visit and explore many differing environments. BioWare decided to opt for a look reminiscent of the early games in the Sonic series, and so opted for more flat-shaded, anime-like characters, as well as saturated, vibrant environments and backdrops. Richard Jacques, long-time producer of music for the Sonic series, composed some of the music tracks for Chronicles, in the traditional Sonic style.

During February 2008, Sega announced that it would be giving fans the opportunity to vote on the name of a hostile alien race that would appear within the game. From March 4, fans were invited to vote on Sega Europe's Sonic portal Sonic City for their preferred name. The winning entry in the contest was announced as The Zoa, a reference to the town in Panzer Dragoon Saga. The name was suggested as a potential name initially by the Sega fan blog Sega Nerds.

The game went gold on September 5, 2008, and was released at the end of the same month in Australia, Europe, and then North America.

Cancelled sequel 
A sequel to the game was once seen as a possibility if the game performed well enough, and the developer, BioWare, had "a precise idea" for how the sequel should be made; another indication of a potential sequel was the nature of the game's ending, which ended on a cliffhanger and left the player with the message "THE END?" However, after BioWare was acquired by Electronic Arts, plans of a sequel had been dropped, and Sonic Chronicles became a one-shot game.

Reception and legacy 

The Dark Brotherhood received "mixed or average" reviews from critics, garnering a 74 out of 100 average at review aggregator Metacritic.

The game received praise in the area of graphics and environments, being "bright, colorful, and cheery", "undeniably nice-looking" with "slick presentation", and with cut-scenes that are "visually sharp".

As Sonic first transition to the RPG genre, the overall scenario, including the game's story and dialogue, were received with mixed reception. Critics acknowledged that, compared to other games in the genre, the "chapter-based story is predictably lightweight and cartoony", and though interesting enough, it "takes a backseat to the actual gameplay". Combined with a generally low difficulty level (also described as "phenomenally easy"), the story and scenario were cited as a good reason that this entry would be suitable as a role-playing game for younger gamers. Reviewers also agreed that the story only begins to become more elaborate and interesting in the second half of the game. The cast of playable characters, who some reviewers acknowledged were less than well received in previous Sonic games, were generally received well, and were "well written and likeable".

Further to the reception of the RPG design, gameplay elements of the role-playing genre also received mixed reception. Some reviewers cited the "overbearing" battle system becoming "an annoyance", while others found the combat system a "joy", with a good difficulty level and "some great tension". The lack of multiplayer options, aside from the ability to share Chao, was also seen as a disappointment.

Other media 
Archie Comics made an adaption of Sonic Chronicles titled Invaders from Beyond, featuring the kidnapping of Knuckles. The short strip only covers what happened before the game's story, which acts as a sort of prologue, and ends by urging readers to buy Sonic Chronicles to find out "what happens next".

However, the game also proved a source of contention with former Archie head writer Ken Penders, who felt that the Nocturnus Clan antagonists were heavily derived from his own Echidna characters in the Archie Comics Sonic titles, whom he subsequently revealed he had copyrighted. Penders filed a lawsuit against Sega and Electronic Arts in 2011 for alleged copyright infringement; the lawsuit was dismissed in favor of Sega/EA three times.

Nocturne, the site of the game's final battle, is also used as the start and finish of the Dream Bobsledding course in the Wii version of ''Mario & Sonic at the Olympic Winter Games.

Notes

References

External links 
 
 

2008 video games
BioWare games
Nintendo DS games
Nintendo DS-only games
Role-playing video games
Sega video games
Video games scored by Richard Jacques
Video games developed in Canada
Video games about parallel universes
Video games set on fictional islands
Single-player video games
Sonic the Hedgehog spin-off games